Dylan Nicole Gelula (born May 7, 1994) is an American actress who is best known for her role of Xanthippe on Unbreakable Kimmy Schmidt, as well as her work in independent film. 

In 2016, Gelula made her film debut as the lead actress with romantic drama film First Girl I Loved, directed by Kerem Sanga. The film premiered at the 2016 Sundance Film Festival and won the audience award for Best Of NEXT. Gelula's performance in the film as Anne received rave reviews from various critics.

She has since appeared in the films Flower, Support the Girls, Under the Eiffel Tower, Her Smell, and had the lead role of "Maggie" in Cooper Raiff's 2020 debut feature Shithouse, which won the Best Narrative Film prize at SXSW Film Festival.

Early life
Gelula was born on May 7, 1994, in Philadelphia, Pennsylvania. She was raised in Reform Judaism. She attended Lower Merion High School and recalls having a difficult time in high school, having been "very lonely, but very comfortable being alone," and showed up to school so infrequently that she was forced to either repeat her senior year or drop out. She ended up dropping out and moving to Los Angeles by herself at the age of seventeen.

Career
Gelula began her acting career at the age of ten as an extra in the M. Night Shyamalan film Lady in the Water, which she later revealed neither she nor her parents ever viewed. Two years after, in the sixth grade, she found a manager. Before moving to Los Angeles, her agent in New York got her an audition for the role of Jean Fordham in an Arden Theatre Company production of August: Osage County, directed by Terry Nolen, which she ended up starring in. She recalls remembering originally trying to turn down the part, but later realizing that she was very interested in it.

After moving to Los Angeles at the age of 17, she worked as a waitress at a high-end restaurant in Santa Monica, from which she was quickly fired. She also worked as a buyer at Wasteland, a resale store. She has had guest roles on NCIS: Naval Criminal Investigative Service, Are We There Yet?, and Law and Order: Special Victims Unit. Gelula has also played Gretchen Doyle on Jennifer Falls, Ford on Chasing Life, and Xanthippe on Unbreakable Kimmy Schmidt.

When Gelula initially auditioned for the role of Xanthippe on Unbreakable Kimmy Schmidt, she was in Los Angeles, but casting was only happening in New York City. She gave the crew of the show an audition tape, and received a call one month later that they were interested in her for the part. The crew asked her to do a table read with the cast before she was given the part, and she eventually received the role. She claims she does not know why the character of Xanthippe was given the name she was given.

In 2020, Dylan created a podcast with Broti Gupta called Lecture Hall, with guests including Ayo Edebiri and Rachel Sennott.

Filmography

Film

Television

Music videos

References

External links

Living people
21st-century American actresses
Actresses from Philadelphia
1994 births
American television actresses
American film actresses
American stage actresses
Jewish American actresses